Quheh (also Romanized as Qūheh) is a village in Chahardangeh Rural District, Chaharbagh District, Savojbolagh County, Alborz Province, Iran. At the 2006 census, its population was 2,079, in 499 families.

References 

Populated places in Savojbolagh County